Laura Sanko (born December 7, 1982) is an American mixed martial arts commentator who currently works for the Ultimate Fighting Championship (UFC). She competed in Invicta Fighting Championships.

Mixed martial arts record

|-
|Win
|align="center" |1–0
|Cassie Robb
|Submission (rear-naked choke)
|Invicta FC 4: Esparza vs. Hyatt
|
|align="center" | 2
|align="center" | 1:07
|Kansas City, Kansas, United States
|
|-
|}

References

External links

 
Laura Sanko ("Fancy") | MMA Fighter Page

1982 births
Living people
American female mixed martial artists
Atomweight mixed martial artists
People from Chicago
American color commentators
William Jewell College alumni